Thames ward in the London Borough of Barking and Dagenham returns three elected representatives every four years. At the 2006 election Fred Barns, Barry Poulton, and Joan Rawlinson, all of the Labour Party (UK) were reelected. The ward includes the large Barking Riverside redevelopment area.

References

External links
 Thames ward profile
 Barking and Dagenham Labour Party

Wards of the London Borough of Barking and Dagenham